Kikha Mahalleh (also Romanized as Kīkhā Maḩalleh; also known as Kīākhā Maḩalleh) is a village in Khoshk Rud Rural District, Rudbast District, Babolsar County, Mazandaran Province, Iran. At the 2006 census, its population was 941, in 237 families.

References 

Populated places in Babolsar County